Asura frigida is a moth of the  family Erebidae. It is found in India.

References

frigida
Moths described in 1854
Moths of Asia